The Scotch Whisky Research Institute (SWRI) is the main, and only, research institute of the scotch whisky industry in Scotland.

History
It was founded on 30 September 1974 as Pentlands Scotch Whisky Research, at the North British Distillery.

It changed to its current name in October 1995. It moved to its present site on 1 August 1997.

Scotch whisky is the UK's fifth-biggest export, and the UK's largest food and drink commodity.

Construction
The first turf was dug on Tuesday 5 December 1995 by Brian McGregor, the chairman. It was to open in September 1996.

It has a pagoda roof, similar to that developed by the Scottish architect Charles C. Doig.

Visits
The new research institute was opened at around 2.20pm on Monday 15 December 1997 by the Princess Royal.

Structure
It is funded by over 90% of whisky producers in Scotland, who are also represented by the Scotch Whisky Association and Scotland Food & Drink.

Research
It works with gas chromatography-olfactometry. It employs biologists and chemists.

See also

Brewing Industry Research Foundation, off the M23 in eastern Surrey
Institute of Brewing and Distilling

References

External links

1974 establishments in Scotland
Alcohol industry trade associations
Biological research institutes in the United Kingdom
British food and drink organisations
Food science institutes
Industrial buildings in Scotland
Research institutes established in 1974
Research institutes in Edinburgh
Scotch whisky